Wilhelm Gustav Karl Bernhard von Hahnke (1 October 1833 in Berlin – 8 February 1912) was a Prussian Field Marshal, and Chief of the German Imperial Military Cabinet from 1888 to 1901.

Biography 
Born into an old Prussian family of officers, he was the son of Wilhelm Hahnke (1793-1861) and his wife Angelique, née von der Lancken (1803-1873). His father was raised to the hereditary Prussian nobility in 1836, thus becoming Wilhelm von Hahnke. After time in the cadet corps Hahnke joined the military as second lieutenant in the 1st Guards Grenadiers in 1851. During the Second Schleswig War, Hahnke served as a company leader. During the Austro-Prussian War he served on the staff of Prince Friedrich Karl of Prussia as a general staff officer. During the Franco-Prussian War he served on the latters staff again and earned the Iron Cross (first class).

In 1888 Hahnke was appointed Chief of the Military Cabinet of the just-crowned Wilhelm II. In January 1905 he was promoted to field marshal. He later was appointed as the Adjutant-General to the Kaiser. He died on 8 February 1912.

Family 
Hahnke married 1865 in Berlin Josephine von Bülow (1842–1911), daughter of Friedrich von Bülow (1789–1853). The couple had seven sons and two daughters, among them:
 Wilhelm (1867–1931), Prussian Major general ∞ Elisabeth von Schlieffen (born 1869), daughter of Field Marshal Alfred von Schlieffen.
 Adolf (3 July 1873 – 6 July 1936), jurist.

Honours and awards 
German honours

Foreign honours

References

Field marshals of Prussia
Members of the Prussian House of Lords
1833 births
1912 deaths
People from the Province of Brandenburg
Military personnel from Berlin
Recipients of the Iron Cross, 1st class
Grand Crosses of the Military Merit Order (Bavaria)
Grand Crosses of the Order of Saint Stephen of Hungary
Grand Crosses of the Order of Military Merit (Bulgaria)
Grand Crosses of the Order of the Dannebrog
Officiers of the Légion d'honneur
Knights Grand Cross of the Order of Saints Maurice and Lazarus
Recipients of the Order of the Crown (Italy)
Grand Cordons of the Order of the Rising Sun
Grand Crosses of the Order of Saint-Charles
Recipients of the Order of the Netherlands Lion
Recipients of the Order of the Medjidie, 1st class
Grand Crosses of the Order of Aviz
Grand Crosses of the Order of the Star of Romania
Grand Crosses of the Order of the Crown (Romania)
Recipients of the Order of St. Vladimir, 4th class
Recipients of the Order of the Cross of Takovo
Commanders Grand Cross of the Order of the Sword
Honorary Knights Grand Cross of the Royal Victorian Order